The 1951 DDR-Oberliga season was the third season of the DDR-Oberliga, the top level of ice hockey in East Germany. Four teams participated in the league, and BSG Ostglas Weißwasser won the championship.

Regular season

References

External links
East German results 1949-1970

East
DDR-Oberliga (ice hockey) seasons
1951 in East German sport
Ger